Stephen P. Reynolds from North Carolina State University, was awarded the status of Fellow in the American Physical Society, after he was nominated by his Division of Astrophysics  in 2000, for contributions to high-energy astrophysics, including modeling relativistic jets in quasars, pulsar-driven supernova remnants, and electron acceleration to synchrotron X-ray emitting energies in young shell supernova remnants, and supporting observations.

References 

Fellows of the American Physical Society
American physicists
Living people
Year of birth missing (living people)